Radio World is a trade journal published by Future US targeted at radio broadcast executives and operations personnel worldwide. Multiple editions are published for the United States, Canada, Europe, the Middle East, Africa, Asia, and the Caribbean in English, Spanish, Portuguese, and French. Columnists range from broadcast industry consultants to legal counsel specializing in the broadcast industry.

Radio World was founded in 1977 by IMAS Publishing and was privately held until IMAS was acquired by NewBay Media in 2007. Future plc acquired NewBay in April 2018.

Sister publications include Radio, TV Technology, Videography, Government Video, TVB, and DV.com.

An unrelated Radio World magazine was published by Hennessy Radio Publications Corp. from 1922 to 1939.

List of editions 
 Radio World (1977)
 Radio World Engineering Extra (2004)
 Radio World Magazine (19941995)
 Tuned In: Radio World's Management Magazine (19961998)
 Radio World International (19892019)
 Radio World International Engineering Extra (20062008)
 Radio World América Latina (19892016)
 Radio World édition francophone (20012016)

References

External links
 

Business magazines published in the United States
Biweekly magazines published in the United States
Professional and trade magazines
Magazines established in 1977